Gao Sheng (born 10 May 1962) is a Chinese football coach and former player who played as a defensive midfielder.

Playing career
Born in Shenyang, Gao began his football career for his hometown football club Liaoning's youth team and later graduated to the senior team in 1983. He quickly made an impression within the team to win many trophies including 1989–90 Asian Club Championship. He accepted Shen Xiangfu's invitation and joined Japanese club Fujitsu in 1991. He retired at Fujitsu in 1995.

Managerial career
Gao became a football coach of Fujitsu (later changed the club name as Kawasaki Frontale) youth team system after his retirement. He back to Liaoning in December 2011 when he joined Liaoning Xingguang, Liaoning's youth team, and served under his former teammate Tang Yaodong as an assistant coach. He was appointed as the assistant coach of Liaoning Zhongyu in January 2003 after Li Shubin was called up into China national team. He resigned from Liaoning in late 2006 and re-joined Kawasaki Frontale. He accepted the invitation of Takeshi Okada to become the assistant coach of Hangzhou Greentown in the Chinese Super League in 2012. He left the club after Okada's resign in November 2013. On 27 November 2013, he signed a three-year contract with another Super League club Liaoning Whowin and became their new manager. On 9 April 2014, he resigned from Liaoning after winning only once in the first five matches of the season.

Personal life
Gao married to a Japanese woman in the 1990s. His son, is currently playing for Gamba Osaka.

Career statistics

International goals
Scores and results list China's goal tally first, score column indicates score after each Gao goal.

Honours

Player
Liaoning	
Chinese National League / Chinese Jia-A League (Top tier): 1985, 1987, 1988, 1990, 1991
Chinese FA Cup: 1984, 1986
Asian Club Championship: 1989–90

References

1962 births
Living people
Chinese footballers
Footballers from Shenyang
Association football midfielders
China international footballers
Liaoning F.C. players
Kawasaki Frontale players
Japan Soccer League players
Footballers at the 1988 Summer Olympics
1988 AFC Asian Cup players
Olympic footballers of China
Footballers at the 1986 Asian Games
Footballers at the 1990 Asian Games
Asian Games competitors for China
Chinese football managers
Liaoning F.C. managers
Chinese expatriate footballers
Chinese expatriate sportspeople in Japan
Expatriate footballers in Japan